The Kickflip, produced by VK Mobile, was one of Helio's two launch devices and was marketed heavily to MySpace users.  The Kickflip is a swiveling cell phone, white in color and with a flat (screen-only) front. Some of the features included 2-megapixel camera, 90 minutes of video recording, side buttons, QVGA screen, and 8 day stand by/3 hour talk time battery life.  Reviewers at PC Magazine and Infosync lauded the phones design aspects, but noted the lack of bluetooth capabilities and a wide range of bugs in the phone applications which affected the basic functionality of the phone.

References

Helio (wireless carrier)
Personal digital assistants